Paweł Zagumny  (born 18 October 1977) is a Polish former professional volleyball player. He was a member of the Poland national team in 1996–2014. A participant at the Olympic Games (Atlanta 1996, Athens 2004, Beijing 2008, London 2012), the 2014 World Champion, 2012 World League winner, and the 2009 European Champion. A former president of the Polish Volleyball League.

Personal life
Paweł Zagumny was born in Jasło, but he grew up in Warszawa, in Ursynów district. He is Hanna and Lech Zagumny's son, his father is a former volleyball player and a coach. Zagumny has a sister, Agnieszka. On 19 July 2003 Zagumny married Oliwia Brochocka-Zagumny. They have two children - a daughter Wiktoria (born 2004) and a son Mikołaj (born 2010).

Career

Clubs
He began to play in 1992 with MKS MDK Warszawa volleyball junior club. His talent was quickly seen and in 1995 at age 18 he was transferred to professional team Czarni Radom, where he played for 2 years. With Zagumny Czarni Radom club won Poland Championship in 1996 and got second place in 1997. Next, he played for Bosman Morze Szczecin for 3 years. In 2000 he was transferred to Italian club Edilbasso Padua, where he stayed for three years. Afterwards he came back to Poland, playing for Mlekpol AZS Olsztyn. In 2010 went to Polish club ZAKSA Kędzierzyn-Koźle. He achieved with this club two Polish Cups (2013, 2014) and two silver (2011, 2013) and bronze (2012) medal of Polish Championship. In April 2015 he announced that he is going to leave ZAKSA Kędzierzyn-Koźle. In May 2015 he signed a contract with AZS Politechnika Warszawska.

He ended up club career on 9 April 2017 after the last match of the season 2016–17 as ONICO AZS Politechnika Warszawska player. The official thanks for his club career was held the day before at Torwar Hall with almost 5,000 fans. His shirt number 5 in ONICO AZS Politechnika Warszawska was reserved until 2022.

National team
In 2006 he was awarded the best setter of FIVB Volleyball Men's World Championship in Japan, where Polish national team won silver medal. In 2007 he was awarded the best setter of FIVB World League in Poland, Katowice. In 2008 he was awarded the best setter of Summer Olympic Games in Beijing. Zagumny was in the Polish squad when the Polish national team won the gold medal of European Championship 2009, where was awarded Best Setter. On 14 September 2009 he was awarded The Order of Polonia Restituta. The Order was conferred on the following day by the Prime Minister of Poland, Donald Tusk. In 2011 the gained silver medal at World Cup. On 8 July 2012 he won a gold medal of World League 2012 in Sofia, Bulgary. On 21 September 2014 he won a title of World Champion 2014. On 27 October 2014 he received a state award granted by the Polish President Bronisław Komorowski - Officer's Cross of Polonia Restituta for outstanding sports achievements and worldwide promotion of Poland. After winning title of 2014 World Champion he announced that the finale was his last match in national team.

On 11 September 2016 an all-star match was organized in Katowice, which was Zagumny's official farewell to the Polish national team and its supporters (12,000 fans at Spodek). In the match Poland vs. the Rest of world took part the most titled and the best players in the history of Polish and world volleyball. Zagumny played 427 matches in the Polish national team.

Honours

Clubs
 CEV Cup
  2010/2011 – with ZAKSA Kędzierzyn-Koźle
 National championships
 1997/1998  Polish Championship, with Morze Bałtyk Szczecin
 2003/2004  Polish Championship, with AZS Olsztyn
 2004/2005  Polish Championship, with AZS Olsztyn
 2009/2010  Greek Cup, with Panathinaikos Athens
 2009/2010  Greek Championship, with Panathinaikos Athens
 2010/2011  Polish Championship, with ZAKSA Kędzierzyn-Koźle
 2012/2013  Polish Cup, with ZAKSA Kędzierzyn-Koźle
 2012/2013  Polish Championship, with ZAKSA Kędzierzyn-Koźle
 2013/2014  Polish Cup, with ZAKSA Kędzierzyn-Koźle

Youth national team
 1996  CEV U21 European Championship
 1997  FIVB U21 World Championship

Individual awards
 2006: FIVB World Championship – Best Setter
 2007: FIVB World League – Best Setter
 2008: Olympic Games – Best Setter
 2009: Polish Cup – Best Setter
 2009: CEV European Championship – Best Setter
 2011: Polish Cup – Best Setter
 2013: Polish Cup – Best Setter
 2014: Polish Cup – Most Valuable Player

State awards
 2006:  Gold Cross of Merit
 2009:  Knight's Cross of Polonia Restituta
 2014:  Officer's Cross of Polonia Restituta

References

External links

 
 Player profile at PlusLiga.pl 
 Player profile at Volleybox.net

1977 births
Living people
People from Jasło
Sportspeople from Podkarpackie Voivodeship
Polish men's volleyball players
Olympic volleyball players of Poland
Volleyball players at the 1996 Summer Olympics
Volleyball players at the 2004 Summer Olympics
Volleyball players at the 2008 Summer Olympics
Volleyball players at the 2012 Summer Olympics
Recipients of the Gold Cross of Merit (Poland)
Knights of the Order of Polonia Restituta
Officers of the Order of Polonia Restituta
Polish expatriate sportspeople in Italy
Expatriate volleyball players in Italy
Polish expatriate sportspeople in Greece
Expatriate volleyball players in Greece
Czarni Radom players
AZS Olsztyn players
Panathinaikos V.C. players
ZAKSA Kędzierzyn-Koźle players
Projekt Warsaw players
Setters (volleyball)